News Watch is an Indonesian English language television on SCTV. It was created, developed, and presented by Arief Suditomo, the former crew of The Jakarta Post from 1992 till 1994. It was broadcast for the first time on 17 March 1997, and ended on 28 April 2000. It broadcasts for 30 minutes from 07:00-07:30 WIB after Liputan 6 Pagi. It based from the same format of TVRI News (now English News Service) and RCTI's Indonesia Today.

It was ended on 28 April 2000 due to SCTV considers this program was less profitable because it is not able to attract advertising and poor rating because the majority of SCTV News Watch viewers average were off to work and school.

Notable news anchors
Kania Sutisnawinata
Nova Poerwadi
Brigitta Priscilla
Fitha Dahana

Segments
 In Focus
 Business, Finance and Capital Market
The Diplomatic Pouch
 Politic
 Law and Criminal
 Social
 Health and Medical
Arts and Culture
 International
 World Sport
 Weather Forecast
 English Daily Newspaper (Morning Paper)
 The Jakarta Post
 Agenda

References

External links
Liputan 6 SCTV's official site
SCTV's official site

Indonesian television news shows
1990s Indonesian television series
2000s Indonesian television series
Television news program articles using incorrect naming style